IRI or I.R.I. refers to:

Businesses and organizations
 Iringa Airport, an airport in Tanzania serving Iringa and the surrounding Iringa Region by IATA airport code
 India Rejuvenation Initiative, an Indian anti-corruption organization formed by top bureaucrats and other dignitaries
 Industrial Research Institute, a nonprofit association for the sharing of best practices in research and development
 Innovative Routines International, Inc., an American software company specializing in data sorting, transformation, reporting, and privacy protection
 Institut de Recherche et d'Innovation, a French research institute, founded by Centre Pompidou and now operated independently
 Institutet för rättsinformatik (Law and Informatics Research Institute), a Swedish research body examining relationships between law and IT
 Intellectual Reserve, Inc., a legal entity of The Church of Jesus Christ of Latter-day Saints
 International Registries, Inc., a company that arranges tax and banking registration for the Marshall Islands
 Islamic Reporting Initiative, an independent not-for-profit organization leading the creation of a sustainability reporting standard based on Islamic principles and values.
 International Republican Institute, a U.S. federal budget funded institution involved with national political parties around the world
 International Research Institute for Climate and Society, a research unit of The Earth Institute
 International Resistance Initiative, a group claiming responsibility for two acts of sabotage in Québec
 IRI (company) (formerly SymphonyIRI Group), a market research company
 Istituto per la Ricostruzione Industriale (Institute for Industrial Reconstruction), a former Italian industrial public group
 Italian Rotors Industries, a defunct Italian helicopter manufacturer

Science and technology
 Indiana Robotics Invitational, the largest off-season FIRST robotics competition
 International Reference Ionosphere, the international standard for modelling the Earth's ionosphere
 International Roughness Index, a dimensionless quantity used for measuring road roughness
 Internationalized Resource Identifier, a generalization of the Uniform Resource Identifier (URI) allowing the use of Unicode
 Interpersonal Reactivity Index, a measurement tool (questionnaire) with a multidimensional approach to empathy assessment

Health care
 Ischemia-reperfusion injury, another name for reperfusion injury
 Irinotecan, a drug in chemotherapy for cancer

Places
 Islamic Republic of Iran, the official name of Iran since 1979
 Iri-ye Olya, a village in East Azerbaijan Province, Iran
 Iri-ye Sofla, a village in East Azerbaijan Province, Iran
 Former name of the city center and railway junction in Iksan, South Korea

People
 iri (artist), Japanese singer/songwriter

See also